The Spot of the Family (Spanish: El lunar de la familia) is a 1953 Mexican film. It stars Sara García.

External links
 

1953 films
1950s Spanish-language films
Mexican black-and-white films
Mexican comedy-drama films
1953 comedy-drama films
1950s Mexican films